Ammawarune is a 2006 Sri Lankan Sinhala drama film directed by Dr. Lester James Peries and produced by Jagath Wijenayake for Silumina Films. It stars Malini Fonseka, and Pradeep Dharmadasa in lead roles along with Roshan Pilapitiya and Sanath Gunathilake. Music composed by veteran musician Premasiri Khemadasa. It is the last film directed by Lester James Pieris as well. The film screened in many countries such as Australia and New Zealand on a special request.

Plot
Sumanawathie's elder son is a Buddhist monk. Her daughter has run from home and married a man who ignores and quarrels with the daughter. Sumanawathie's younger son Saliya gets a job as a soldier. Sumanawathi gets upset as she is left alone in her house. As the film progresses she gets to know that her son has disappeared during a war operation. Her health declines rapidly. After a long time, Saliya comes again to her home alive. Meanwhile her elder son is killed by terrorists when he travels with a team to distribute goods to the poor people.

Cast

References

External links
 

2006 films
2000s Sinhala-language films
2006 drama films
Sri Lankan drama films